Guillermo Israilevich (born September 10, 1982) is a retired Argentinian-Israeli footballer.

Club career
After the 06/07 season, Israilevich signed a 3-year contract with Hapoel Kfar Saba, which is worth $200,000 per season. He transferred to Maccabi Tel Aviv on 29/06/2008. Maccabi Tel Aviv had to pay 550,000 Dollars for him. He has signed a contract for 3 years.

National Team Confusion
On October 4, 2006 Israilevich was called up to the Israeli national team to replace the injured Michael Zandberg before a European qualifier against Russia. The Israel Football Association had forgotten that they had already received a warning from FIFA not to have Israilevich play any more matches after he represented Israel twice with the Israel under-21 side. It seems that he had already played for Argentina in a FIFA recognized competition at the youth level and is ineligible to represent Israel at any level without special permission from FIFA. As a result, the Israel national football team left for Moscow, Russia with only 19 players

Personal life
Born to a Jewish father and a Christian mother, Israilevich has said that he is not a practitioner of either religion.

Honours
Toto Cup:
2008/09

References

1982 births
Living people
Footballers from Santa Fe, Argentina
Argentine Jews
Argentine footballers
Argentine emigrants to Israel
Israeli footballers
Israeli Premier League players
Jewish Argentine sportspeople
Liga Leumit players
Boca Unidos footballers
Maccabi Haifa F.C. players
Maccabi Tel Aviv F.C. players
Hapoel Nof HaGalil F.C. players
Hapoel Kfar Saba F.C. players
Israeli people of Argentine-Jewish descent
Israeli people of Argentine descent
Sportspeople of Argentine descent
Association football midfielders